The Constitutional Court is a special court, defined by the Portuguese Constitution as part of the judicial branch of the Portuguese political organization. Unlike the rest of the country's courts, the Constitutional Court has important characteristics, such as a special composition, and unique competences. The main task of the court is to review the constitutionality of the newly approved laws, but it also has important powers related to the President of the Republic, the political parties, and referendums.

The Portuguese Constitution defines the Constitutional Court as a completely independent organ that operates independently from the other branches of government, such as the Executive or the Legislative. The Justices of the Constitutional Court are independent and cannot be impeached. The decisions of the court are above the decisions of any other authority.

The court convenes in Lisbon, in the Ratton Palace located in Bairro Alto.

Organization

The court is composed by thirteen Justices, ten of them are elected by the Assembly of the Republic, the main legislative branch of the country, and they must be elected by two thirds majority of the members of the Assembly. The remaining three are elected by the already elected Justices. Of the thirteen Justices, six must be chosen among the general court's judges, the remaining must have at least a degree in law. The Justices serve a nine years mandate and cannot be re-elected.

The Constitutional Court elects its own president and vice-president and approves its own rules, schedule and budget.

The President of the Constitutional Court (together with the President of the Supreme Court) is the fourth person in the Portuguese state hierarchy (after the President of the Republic, the President of the Assembly of the Republic, and the Prime Minister, in that order) and has several competences, such as conducting the relations between the court and the other authorities, receiving the candidatures for President of the Republic and presiding the court's sessions. The current president is João Caupers.

Competences

The Constitutional Court has several competences, defined in the Constitution, such as:

 Assure that the Constitution and regional autonomies are respected;
 Review and assure the constitutionality of the laws;
 Declare the President's death or inability to carry out his tasks;
 Manage the electoral processes;
 Assure that political parties fulfil the legal requirements to exist;
 Prohibit and dissolve fascist parties and organizations;
 Assure the legality of the national and local referendums.

See also
Judiciary of Portugal
Portuguese Supreme Court of Justice
Portuguese Court of Audits
Portuguese Supreme Administrative Court
Politics of Portugal
Constitution of Portugal

References

External links

Law of Portugal
Politics of Portugal
Portugal
Judiciary of Portugal
1982 establishments in Portugal
Courts and tribunals established in 1982